Jeanne E. Poppe (born July 6, 1957) is a Minnesota politician and former member of the Minnesota House of Representatives. A member of the Minnesota Democratic–Farmer–Labor Party (DFL), she represented District 27B, which includes all or portions of Dodge, Freeborn, and Mower counties in the southeastern part of the state. She is an educator and counselor at Riverland Community College, with campuses in Albert Lea, Austin and Owatonna.

Early life, education, and career
Poppe was born in Houston, Minnesota and attended Houston High School where she graduated in 1975. She graduated from the University of Wisconsin in River Falls, receiving her B.A. in Sociology and Criminal Justice in 1980. She earned her M.S. in Counseling from Winona State University in Winona in 1985.

She has been a college counselor at Riverland Community College since 1999, also serving as president of the Minnesota State College Faculty Counselors Association from 2002-2004. Prior to her work as a counselor, she was the college's director of admissions from 1995–1999, and the women's center director from 1993-1995. She was a workforce career counselor for the Private Industry Council from 1989–1993, and a senior citizens' paralegal for Southern Minnesota Regional Legal Services from 1984-1989.

Active in her local community through the years, Poppe served on the Austin City Council (Ward 2) from 1994 to 2002, and was secretary of the Austin Human Rights Commission from 2002 to 2004. She has been a trustee of the Austin Area Foundation since 2003, and a member of the Austin Area League of Women Voters since 1987.

Minnesota House of Representatives

Elections
Poppe ran unsuccessfully in 2002 against Rep. Jeff Anderson.  She was first elected in 2004 defeating Anderson in a close race.  She was re-elected in 2006, 2008, 2010, 2012, and 2014, 2016, and 2018 before being unseated in 2020.

Committee assignments
For the 89th Minnesota Legislature, Poppe is a part of:
Agriculture Finance Committee (DFL Lead)
Agriculture Policy Committee
Capital Investment Committee
Environment and Natural Resources Policy and Finance Committee
Ways and Means Committee

For the 88th Minnesota Legislature, Poppe was part of:
Agriculture Policy (Chair) Committee 
Environment, Natural Resources and Agriculture Finance Committee 
Higher Education Finance and Policy Committee
Ways and Means Committee

For the 87th Minnesota Legislature, Poppe was part of:
Agriculture and Rural Development Policy and Finance Committee 
Higher Education Policy and Finance Committee 
Redistricting Committee

For the 86th Minnesota Legislature, Poppe was part of:
Finance Subcommittee: Higher Education and Workforce Development Finance and Policy Division
Bioscience and Workforce Development Policy and Oversight Division Committee
Finance Subcommittee: State Government Finance Division
State and Local Government Operations Reform, Technology and Elections Committee

For the 85th Minnesota Legislature, Poppe was part of:
Finance Committee 
Finance Subcommittee: Agriculture, Rural Economies and Veterans Affairs Finance Division
Finance Subcommittee: Education Finance and Economic Competitiveness Finance Division: Higher Education and Work Force Development Policy and Finance Division 
Finance Subcommittee: State Government Finance Division 
Governmental Operations, Reform, Technology and Elections Committee

For the 84th Minnesota Legislature, Poppe was part of:
Environment and Natural Resources Committee
Local Government Committee 
Rules and Legislative Administration Committee

Tenure
Poppe was sworn in on January 4, 2005.  She served in the 84th, 85th, 86th, 87th, 88th, 89th, 90th, and 91st Minnesota Legislatures.

Personal life
Poppe resides in Austin, Minnesota, and was married to Bob Vilt who died July 13, 2017. They have three children, Lydia, Casey, Skyler.

References

External links
 

 Rep. Poppe Web Page
 Project Votesmart - Rep. Jeanne Poppe Profile
 Minnesota Public Radio Votetracker: Rep. Jeanne Poppe
 Jeanne Poppe Campaign Web Site

1957 births
Living people
People from Houston, Minnesota
American Lutherans
Democratic Party members of the Minnesota House of Representatives
Minnesota city council members
Women state legislators in Minnesota
University of Wisconsin–River Falls alumni
21st-century American politicians
21st-century American women politicians
People from Austin, Minnesota